Qianfeng District is a district of the prefecture-level city of Guang'an in Sichuan province, China. It was created in February 2013 by splitting off a subdistrict, seven towns and five townships from Guang'an District. The seat of the district is at Qianfeng Town.

Administrative divisions
Qianfeng District is divided into one subdistrict, seven towns, and five townships:
Kuige Subdistrict (奎阁街道)
Qianfeng Town (前锋)
Daishi Town (代市)
Guantang Town (观塘)
Hu'an Town (护安)
Guangxing Town (广兴)
Guange Town (观阁)
Guixing Town (桂兴)
Guanghui Township (光辉)
Longtan Township (龙滩)
Xiaojing Township (小井)
Xinqiao Township (新桥)
Hucheng Township (虎城)

References

Districts of Sichuan
2013 establishments in China
Populated places established in 2013
Guang'an